Tracy Scouter "Dick" Barrett (September 28, 1906 – October 30, 1966) was an American professional baseball pitcher. He played in Major League Baseball (MLB) for the Philadelphia Athletics, Boston Braves, Chicago Cubs, and Philadelphia Phillies. A native of Montoursville, Pennsylvania, he attended University of Illinois at Urbana-Champaign.

Biography
Barrett had a very long minor league career, spanning 21 seasons from 1926 to 1953. He played for many minor teams during that time:

 Williamsport Grays (1925, 1926)
 Scottdale Scotties (1926, 1927)
 Albany Senators (1928, 1929, 1934)
 Binghampton Triplets (1928)
 Jersey City Skeeters (1929, 1930)
 Wilkes-Barre Barons (1929, 1930, 1931)
 Chambersburg Young Yanks (1929)
 Elmira Colonels (1931)
 Elmira Red Wings (1932)
 Houston Buffaloes (1932)

 Seattle Indians (1935,1936, 1937, 1938, 1939, 1949, 1941, 1942)
 Portland Beavers (1946)
 Seattle Raniers (1947, 1948, 1949)
 San Diego Padres (1949, 1950)
 Hollywood Stars (1950)
 Victoria Athletics (1951)
 Yakima Bears (1951)
 Vancouver Capilanos (1953)

For his minor-league contributions, Barrett was inducted in the Pacific Coast League Hall of Fame.

In a five-season major league career, Barrett posted a 35–58 record with 271 strikeouts and a 4.28 ERA in 141 appearances, including 91 starts, 32 complete games, three shutouts, two saves, and 729.0 innings of work. In the minor leagues, Barrett won 325 games in a 24-season career.

References

External links

Boston Braves players
Chicago Cubs players
Philadelphia Athletics players
Philadelphia Phillies players
Chambersburg Young Yanks players
Major League Baseball pitchers
Baseball players from Pennsylvania
Illinois Fighting Illini baseball players
1906 births
1966 deaths
Scottdale Scotties players
Albany Senators players
Binghamton Triplets players
Elmira Colonels players
Elmira Red Wings players
Hollywood Stars players
Houston Buffaloes players
Jersey City Skeeters players
Portland Beavers players
Seattle Indians players
Seattle Rainiers players
Vancouver Capilanos players
Victoria Athletics players
Wilkes-Barre Barons (baseball) players
Williamsport Grays players
Yakima Bears players